The Liberal Jewish Cemetery, Willesden, is a cemetery for Jews in Pound Lane, Willesden, in the London Borough of Brent.  It is adjacent to Willesden United Synagogue Cemetery. Established in 1911 by the Liberal Jewish Synagogue, it opened in 1914 and was originally known as the Liberal Jewish and Belsize Square Cemetery. Several notable British Jews, including members of the Sassoon family, are buried at the cemetery, which also has a Grade II listed war memorial.

Prayer hall and war memorial
The cemetery's prayer hall, in Queen Anne Revival architectural style, was designed by Ernest Joseph and erected in the 1920s; it was extended in 1963. Directly opposite the prayer hall is a Grade II listed war memorial, commemorating 22 people who died in the First World War. Historic England describe it as "one of very few freestanding First World War memorials which specifically commemorate Jewish service personnel". A plaque was added later  to commemorate those who died in the Second World War.

Notable burials
Notable people buried at the cemetery include:

War graves
The cemetery contains the Commonwealth war graves of a World War I Royal Flying Corps officer and, from World War II, a Royal Navy officer, two soldiers and an officer of the British Army and an airman and two officers of the Royal Air Force.

See also
 Jewish cemeteries in the London area
 Willesden United Synagogue Cemetery, usually known as Willesden Jewish Cemetery, which is adjacent to this one
Willesden New Cemetery
Liberal Judaism (United Kingdom)

References

External links
Official website
London Gardens Online: Liberal Jewish Cemetery

Jewish Cemetery, Willesden
Cemetery, Willesden
Ernest Joseph buildings
Grade II listed buildings in the London Borough of Brent
Willesden
Cemetery, Willesden
Monuments and memorials in London
Liberal Jewish Cemetery, Willesden
Queen Anne Revival architecture in the United Kingdom
Liberal Jewish Cemetery, Willesden
Liberal Jewish Cemetery
Jewish Cemetery, Willesden
Jewish Cemetery, Willesden
Sassoon family
Liberal Judaism (United Kingdom)